The discography of Hadouken!, a Leeds-based grindie band, currently consists of three studio albums, six EPs, ten singles, and twenty two music videos.

Studio albums

Extended plays

Singles

Music videos

References 

Discographies of British artists